Coroban, Vasile (14 February 1910, Camenca, Glodeni - 19 October 1984, Chişinău) was a writer from Moldova. He was a non-conformist literary historian and critic from Moldavian Soviet Socialist Republic (MSSR) (nowadays Republic of Moldova), PhD in philology (1958). Beginning in 1954, he was a member of the Writers' Union of SSRM. In 1935, he graduated from the law faculty of the University of Iași.  He edited the newspaper "University Life" that had an anti-fascist orientation, and because of that, he was convicted.

After 28 June 1940 he collaborated with the newspaper "Soviet Earth" from Bălți. In 1942-1945, he was a teacher at the general school in the Kemerovo region. After 1945, he worked as a secretary responsible for the newspaper "Luceafărul roșu" (Bălți). Since 1947, he collaborated with the Institute of Language and Literature of the Academy of Sciences of Moldova (ASM). Within the institute he held the position of head of the Literary Theory Sector.  He was the author and editor of school textbooks in MSSR. He published research works on Romanian and Universal Classical Literature, and explored the literary phenomenon in the MSSR.

Biography 
He graduate from the University of Iaşi in 1935 and became a member of the Moldovan Writers' Union in 1954.

Works
 Constantin Dobrogeanu-Gherea. Studiu introductiv, Ch.
 Vasile Alecsandri: viaţa şi opera, Ch., 1957
 Летописец Ион Некулче (1958)
 Scriitorii Moldovei Sovietice. Indice bibliografic, Ch., 1969 (redactor)
 Romanul moldovenesc contemporan, Ch. 1969 (original), 1974, 1979, în limba rusă
 Pagini de critică literară, Ch., 1971
 Opere alese, Ch., ed. Literatura artistică, 1983
 Dimitrie Cantemir – scriitor umanist, eseu, Ch., ed. Cartea Moldovei, 2003

Bibliography
 Anatol Eremia, Unitatea patrimoniului onomastic românesc. Toponimie. Antroponimie ediţie jubiliară, 2001, Centrul Naţional de Terminologie, ed. „Iulian”, Chişinău, .

References

External links 

 Vocea Basarabiei, Vasile Coroban – un model de conştiinţă românească
 Jurnal de Chişinău, „A urât mediocritatea” – Vasile Coroban – 100 de ani
 Vasile COROBAN
 Vasile Coroban, omagiat la bastina

Romanian people of Moldovan descent
1910 births
1984 deaths
Eastern Orthodox Christians from Romania
Alexandru Ioan Cuza University alumni
Moldovan writers
Moldovan male writers
Romanian writers
People from Glodeni District